Parthenina  sergei is a species of sea snail, a marine gastropod mollusk in the family Pyramidellidae, the pyrams and their allies.

Distribution
This species occurs in the following locations:
 Known to be located off the west coast of Africa.

References

 Peñas, A.; Rolán, E.; Swinnen, F. (2014). The superfamily Pyramidelloidea Gray, 1840 (Mollusca, Gastropoda, Heterobranchia) in West Africa, 11. Addenda 3. Iberus. 32(2): 105-206 page(s): 116

External links
 To World Register of Marine Species

Pyramidellidae
Gastropods described in 1994